Strutton Ground Market is a small street market held on weekdays near Victoria, London. The market is located on a narrow cobbled street - Strutton Ground - between Victoria Street and Greycoat Place/Great Peter Street. This market is one of the most centrally located street markets in London, being close to the Palace of Westminster and Victoria railway station.

The market is open weekdays from 10:00 to 16:00. The market mainly caters for local residents and the office population in the immediate Victoria Street area, selling food, groceries, books and clothing, but is becoming increasingly popular with tourists.

The market is organised and regulated by Westminster City Council.  The coffee stall "Flatcap" won Westminster City Council's 2010 Market Trader of the Year award, voted for by customers.

References

Retail markets in London
Victoria, London